Black Science may refer to:

 Black Science (GZR album), 1997
 Black Science (Steve Coleman album), 1991
 Black Science (comics), an American science fiction comic book